The Norwegian Defence Cross of Honour is a medal which is awarded by the commander of the Norwegian Defence forces to persons having performed Meritious work in or for the Norwegian defence forces. 

The Medal was established by royal decree on 30 January 2012, after a proposal of the commander of the Norwegian forces. It ranks as number 18 in the list of Norwegian decorations, though it is equal to the Norwegian Police Cross of Honour and  Civil Defence Cross of Honour ranked 16th and 17th by seniority only.

The Norwegian Defence Cross of Honour consists of a cross with slightly splayed out arms, with the Norwegian armed forces herald (Coat of arms of Norway with point up, crossed swords) in the cross-junction; The cross is lain over silver laurels.

Notable recipients 
Gunnar Sønsteby

See also
Orders, decorations, and medals of Norway

References

Military awards and decorations of Norway
Awards established in 2012
2012 establishments in Norway